Edgar González Estrada (born 1 April 1997) is a Spanish professional footballer who plays for La Liga club Real Betis as a centre-back.

Club career
Born in Sant Joan Despí, Barcelona, Catalonia, González joined RCD Espanyol's youth setup in July 2015, from UE Cornellà. On 1 July 2016, after finishing his formation, he returned to his previous club Cornellà, on loan for one year.

González made his senior debut on 31 August 2016, playing the last 33 minutes in a 2–1 home defeat of UD San Sebastián de los Reyes, for the season's Copa del Rey. The following 3 July, after 13 appearances, he renewed his contract with the Pericos until 2020 and remained on loan at Cornellà for one further season.

On 6 July 2018, González agreed to a contract with Real Betis, being initially assigned to the reserves in Tercera División. He made his first team debut on 1 November, playing the full 90 minutes in a 1–0 away success over Racing de Santander, also for the national cup.

González made his La Liga debut on 23 November 2019, starting in a 2–1 home win against Valencia CF. The following 21 July, he renewed his contract until 2023 and was promoted to the first team.

On 3 September 2020, González was loaned to Segunda División side Real Oviedo for the season. He scored his first professional goals on 8 November, netting a brace in a 4–0 home routing of CD Castellón.

Career statistics

Club

Honours
Betis
Copa del Rey: 2021–22

References

External links

Profile at the Real Betis website

Beticopedia profile 

1997 births
Living people
People from Sant Joan Despí
Sportspeople from the Province of Barcelona
Spanish footballers
Footballers from Catalonia
Association football defenders
La Liga players
Segunda División players
Segunda División B players
Tercera División players
RCD Espanyol B footballers
UE Cornellà players
Betis Deportivo Balompié footballers
Real Betis players
Real Oviedo players
Catalonia international footballers